The Verismo (meaning "realism", from Italian vero, meaning "true") refers to a 19th-century Italian painting style. This style was practiced most characteristically by the "Macchiaioli" group of painters, who were forerunners of the French Impressionists.

In this regard, the Wikipedia article on "American verismo" is germane because it contains a long discussion of an instance of American verismo (Jerry Ross) in American painting. However, there is an extremely rich reservoir of American examples that include techniques for loose brushwork alongside social commentary such as in "The Ashcan School" and the work of John Singer Sargent and the bold city and landscapes of George Bellows.

The link pin between European verismo in painting and the States could be considered to be the work of John Singer Sargent, in regard to technique, but not in comments on the working classes. As mentioned above, the Ashcan School played the social critical role in regard to thinking and ideas in painting.

See also
 Verismo (literature)
 Verismo (music)

References

Italian art movements